Longview Public Schools is a school district headquartered in Longview, Washington.

Schools

High schools:
 RA Long High School
 Mark Morris High School
 Discovery High School

Middle schools:
 Cascade Middle School
 Monticello Middle School
 Mt. Solo Middle School

Elementary schools:
 Columbia Heights Elementary
 CVG Elementary
 Kessler Elementary
 Mint Valley Elementary
 Northlake Elementary
 Olympic Elementary
 Robert Gray Elementary
 St Helens Elementary

Other:
 Broadway Learning Center

References

External links
 Longview Public Schools
School districts in Washington (state)